Vagharsh Bogdani Vagharshian (14 February 1894 – 6 May 1959) was a Soviet and Armenian actor, director, playwright and public figure. People's Artist of the USSR (1954). 

Vagharshian graduated from a diocese school in Shushi and then worked with an Armenian theater crews in Baku, Azerbaijan. Since 1923 he performed at the Sundukyan State Academic Theatre. In 1941–1944 he was the artistic director of the theater and starred in a number of films. Since 1944 he taught acting at the Yerevan State Institute of Theatre and Cinematography. He was a deputy of the Supreme Council of USSR. The Song of First Love (1958) was Vagharshian's last film in which he acted.

References

1894 births
1959 deaths
20th-century Armenian male actors
Actors from Shusha
Communist Party of the Soviet Union members
First convocation members of the Soviet of the Union
Academic staff of the Yerevan State Institute of Theatre and Cinematography
People's Artists of Armenia
People's Artists of the USSR
Stalin Prize winners
Recipients of the Order of Lenin
Recipients of the Order of the Red Banner of Labour
Ethnic Armenian male actors
Soviet Armenians
Armenian dramatists and playwrights
Armenian male film actors
Armenian male stage actors
Armenian theatre directors
Soviet dramatists and playwrights
Soviet male film actors
Soviet male stage actors
Soviet theatre directors